Spelljammer was a comic book produced by DC Comics under license from TSR.

Publication history
From 1988 to 1991, DC Comics published several licensed D&D comics, including Advanced Dungeons & Dragons, Dragonlance, Forgotten Realms, and Spelljammer. Spelljammer launched one month after the annual anthology, TSR Worlds #1, was published in July 1990. Barbara Kesel wrote the Spelljammer comic from 1990-1991. 

Fifteen comics issues set in the Spelljammer universe were published by DC Comics between September 1990 and November 1991 with the creative team of Kesel, Michael Collins and Dan Panosian. Joe Quesada illustrated issues #8–13, 15 (1991), and Don Heck's final DC work was penciling and inking over Quesada's layouts for Spelljammer #11 (July 1991); Dave Simons also provided artwork for the title. Elliot S! Maggin served as an editor for DC from 1989 to 1991 and oversaw the licensed TSR titles, including Spelljammer.

Characters

Spelljammer comics use Jasmine, a winged human character originally introduced from Forgotten Realms comics, as one of the lead characters.

In the TSR Worlds Annual #1 (chapter 4), the crew of the Realms Master (from the Forgotten Realms comic series) arrive at the lich's frozen castle only to be attacked by a deceived Meridith, Tember, and Pax (from the Spelljammer comic). After both parties realize they are on the same side, Dwalimor tricks the lich into bringing down his castle upon himself and Ishi wins the duel of hearts when Priam chooses to save her over Jasmine. Jasmine leaves the Realms Master to join the crew of the space faring Spelljammer.

References

DC Comics titles
Dungeons & Dragons comics
Spelljammer